Skarpe Nord is an ice skating rink in Kungälv. It is the home of IFK Kungälv, Kareby IS, and Kungälvs SK. It is open to the public in the winter, when it is cold and there is ice on the rink.

References

Bandy venues in Sweden
Sport in Kungälv